PTP may refer to:

Science and technology
partial thumb print,an Impression left by friction ridges of a human thumb
 Peak-to-peak, an amplitude of a signal
 Permeability transition pore, a mitochondrial channel protein complex
 Post-tetanic potentiation, a short-lived form of synaptic plasticity
 Post-transfusion purpura, a type of adverse reaction to a blood transfusion
 Protein tyrosine phosphatase, a group of enzymes

Computing
 PET Transfer Protocol, a file transfer protocol developed for Commodore-based bulletin boards
 Picture Transfer Protocol, a protocol for digital cameras
 Precision Time Protocol, a time synchronization protocol

Music
 PTP (artist collective), an American experimental music collective and record label
 PTP (band) (Programming the Psychodrill), an American industrial music group, side project of Ministry
 Pay Money to My Pain, a Japanese rock band
 Phonation threshold pressure, the amount of air pressure required to initiate vibration of the vocal cords

Organisations
 Pheu Thai Party, a political party in Thailand
 Portuguese Labour Party, a left-of-centre political party in Portugal
 Togolese Party of Progress, a defunct political party in Togoland

Places
 Pointe-à-Pitre International Airport (IATA code), Guadeloupe
 Port of Tanjung Pelepas, in Johor, Malaysia

Other uses
 Practitioner Training Programme, of the UK Modernising Scientific Careers initiative
 Professional transportation planner, an American personal certification program
 Publicly traded partnership, a limited partnership whose interests are regularly traded on an established securities market.

See also
 Peer-to-peer (P2P)
 Point-to-point (disambiguation)
 P2P (disambiguation)